HMS D6 was one of eight D-class submarine built for the Royal Navy during the first decade of the 20th century.

Description
The D-class submarines were designed as improved and enlarged versions of the preceding C class, with diesel engines replacing the dangerous petrol engines used earlier. D3 and subsequent boats were slightly larger than the earlier boats. They displaced  on the surface and  submerged. The D-class submarines had a crew of 25 officers and ratings and were the first to adopt saddle tanks.

For surface running, the boats were powered by two  diesels, each driving one propeller shaft. When submerged each propeller was driven by a  electric motor. They could reach  on the surface and  underwater.

The boats were armed with three 18-inch (45 cm) torpedo tubes, two in the bow and one in the stern. They carried one reload for each tube, a total of six torpedoes.

Construction and career
D6 was laid down on 24 February 1910 by Vickers at their Barrow shipyard, launched 23 October 1911 and was commissioned on 19 April 1912. She was the first British submarine to be equipped with a deck gun when built, a 12-pounder (3-inch/76mm) gun. D6 was sunk by UB-73 73 miles north of Inishtrahull Island off the west coast of Ireland on 24 or 28 June 1918.  There were two survivors who were taken prisoner. Their post-war report apparently led the British to conclude that the torpedo that sank her had employed a magnetic pistol.

Notes

References

External links
 HMS D6 Roll of Honour

 

British D-class submarines
Royal Navy ship names
Ships built in Barrow-in-Furness
World War I shipwrecks in the Atlantic Ocean
Ships sunk by German submarines in World War I
Lost submarines of the United Kingdom
1911 ships
Maritime incidents in 1918